Michael R. Eastman is a United States Army brigadier general who most recently served as the Special Assistant to the Director of the Army Staff. Previously, he was the Deputy Commanding General (Support) of the 10th Mountain Division. and the last US General to command Train, Advise, Assist Command - South and Kandahar Airfield, Afghanistan.  

A 1991 Distinguished Graduate of the United States Military Academy, Eastman holds a BS in International Relations from the US Military Academy, an MMAS in Military History from the Command and General Staff College, and an MS and PhD(ABD) in Political Science from the Massachusetts Institute of Technology.  He also attended the British Higher Command and Staff College in Shrivenham, England as the sole American military representative, and served as a Senior Fellow at the Institute of World Politics.

References

External links

Year of birth missing (living people)
Living people
Place of birth missing (living people)
United States Army generals